Edward Sampson was an Anglican priest in Ireland in the 18th century.

Sampson was  born in Cork and educated at Trinity College, Dublin. He was Archdeacon of Aghadoe from 1728 to 1736.

References

Alumni of Trinity College Dublin
18th-century Irish Anglican priests
Archdeacons of Aghadoe
Clergy from Cork (city)